Club Deportivo Once Berlinés are a Salvadoran professional football club based in Berlín in the department of Usulután Department, El Salvador.

History
On 21 February, 1921 the club was founder by Raúl Clemente Baires, Mauricio Botter and Mauricio Balcaceres under the name Equipo Canario.
The club achieved some unique experiences including the first team to defeat the first Champion of El Salvador Chinameca S.C. by the score 2-0 in 1928.

Personnel

Management

Coaching staff

Notable players
 Óscar Benítez
 Jaime Portillo (1970 world cup player)

List of coaches
  Eliazar Campos (1960)
  Ricardo Caron Campos (1977)
  Víctor Antonio Díaz (2018)

External links
 Club info - Cero A Cero
 
 

Football clubs in El Salvador
Association football clubs established in 1921
1921 establishments in El Salvador